Methylated-thiol-coenzyme M methyltransferase (mtsA (gene)) is an enzyme with systematic name methylated-thiol:coenzyme M methyltransferase. This enzyme catalyses the following chemical reaction:

This enzyme involved in methanogenesis from methylated thiols, such as methanethiol, dimethyl sulfide, and 3-S-methylmercaptopropionate.

References

External links 
 

EC 2.1.1